Scarlet bottlebrush is a common name for several plants and may refer to:

Callistemon brachyandrus
Callistemon rugulosus, endemic to South Australia and Victoria